Gregory Award refer to:

 Emily L. Gregory Award, given by Barnard College in honor of Emily Gregory
 Eric Gregory Award, given by the British Society of Authors
 John A. Gregory Award for Fundamental Contributions to the Field of Geometric modeling
 Joseph T. Gregory Award, given by the Society of Vertebrate Paleontology
 Mike Gregory Award, given by the North Coast Athletic Conference in honor of the first recipient Mike Gregory
 Gregory Awards, presented by Theatre Puget Sound, Washington